Gypped in the Penthouse is a 1955 short subject directed by Jules White starring American slapstick comedy team The Three Stooges (Moe Howard, Larry Fine and Shemp Howard). It is the 161st entry in the series released by Columbia Pictures starring the comedians, who released 190 shorts for the studio between 1934 and 1959.

Plot
At the Woman Haters Club, Larry and Shemp exchange stories of their disastrous encounters with a gold digger, who turns out to be the same woman (Jean Willes). Jane became engaged to Larry, only to dump him when Moe shows up with a larger diamond ring. Shemp is a good samaritan, who winds up in Jane's apartment after a good deed, and chased by her husband Moe when he returns home early (Jane explains, "He was on a business trip. That's separated, isn't it?!")

After telling their stories, they drown their sorrows in beer, and Shemp and Larry are introduced by fellow club member Charlie (Emil Sitka), to the club's newest recruit: Moe. both Larry and Shemp run out of the club and run into the same woman, taking revenge on her by taking the food out of the woman's bags, and making a mess of herself in protest.

Cast
 Shemp Howard as Shemp
 Larry Fine as Larry
 Moe Howard as Moe
 Jean Willes as Jane
 Emil Sitka as Charlie
 Al Thompson as Club Guest (uncredited)

Production notes
Gypped in the Penthouse was filmed on July 19–21, 1954.  Moe and Larry joined a club of the same name two decades previous in 1934's Woman Haters, the Stooges' first film for Columbia.

Over the course of their 24 years at Columbia Pictures, the Stooges would occasionally be cast as separate characters. This course of action always worked against the team; author Jon Solomon concluded "when the writing divides them, they lose their comic dynamic." In addition to this split occurring in Gypped in the Penthouse, the trio also played separate characters in Rockin' in the Rockies, Cuckoo on a Choo Choo, Flying Saucer Daffy, Sweet and Hot, He Cooked His Goose, and its remake Triple Crossed.

The film makes reference to Liberace, without mentioning his name, when Shemp entertains the woman at the piano with a candelabra. He sings a variation of "home on the range" and excentuates the "George" in the locality of Georgia which also refers to Liberace's brother George. The song features a pre_recorded piano playing, before he accidentally drops the ring inside the piano, causing him to go inside the keyboard, wrecking it. the woman finds the ring, and as a punishment, uses the ring to pay for the damages to her piano, therefore, severing Shemp's relationship.

See also
 List of American films of 1955

References

External links
 
 
 Gypped in the Penthouse at threestooges.net

1955 films
1955 comedy films
American black-and-white films
Films directed by Jules White
The Three Stooges films
Columbia Pictures short films
1950s English-language films
1950s American films
American comedy short films